The Castel C-36 was a performance glider built in the late 1930s in France. It was a glider of high-wing monoplane configuration.

Specifications

References

Glider aircraft
1930s French sailplanes
Aircraft first flown in 1937